Guadalupe Peak, also known as Signal Peak, is the highest natural point in Texas, with an elevation of  above sea level. It is located in Guadalupe Mountains National Park, and is part of the Guadalupe Mountains range in southeastern New Mexico and West Texas.

Trail and summit
The peak can be climbed by a maintained stony trail ( each way) with a 3,000 feet elevation gain at any time of the year. The trail is part of the network of hiking trails in the surrounding national park.

A stainless steel pyramid marks the summit. It was erected by American Airlines in 1958 to commemorate the 100th anniversary of the Butterfield Overland Mail, a stagecoach route that passed south of the mountain. One side of the pyramid has the American Airlines logo. The second side displays a U.S. Postal Service tribute to the Pony Express Riders of the Butterfield Stage. The third side displays a compass with the logo of the Boy Scouts of America. 

A hiker was found dead on New Year's Eve 2022, as there were wind gusts of more than 50 miles per hour and wind chills were "well below freezing" that day, according to the release.

"At nearly 9,000 feet above sea level, Guadalupe Peak is a mountain environment with associated risks not found elsewhere in Texas," the park said, noting that the hike is a "very strenuous, 8.4 mile round trip hike with a 3,000 foot elevation gain" to the highest point in the state.

Gallery

See also

List of mountain peaks of North America
List of mountain peaks of the United States
List of U.S. states by elevation

References

External links

 
 
 
 

Mountains of Texas
Highest points of United States national parks
Landforms of Culberson County, Texas
Guadalupe Mountains National Park
Highest points of U.S. states
North American 2000 m summits